For the Winter Olympics, there are 37 venues that have been or will be used for alpine skiing. Most of the events took place in multiple locations at the Winter Olympics, though a single venue for all events has been used  in recent Games in an effort to lessen economic and environmental concerns.

References

Venues
 
Alpine skiing